Content security may refer to:
 Network security, the provisions and policies adopted to prevent and monitor unauthorized access, misuse, modification, or denial of a computer network
 Content filtering,  software designed and optimized for controlling what content is permitted to a reader via the Internet
 Digital rights management, a class of technologies used by manufacturers, publishers, copyright holders, and individuals to control the use of digital content and devices after sale

See also
 Content Security Policy
 Buzzword